Arturo Velazco is an American former soccer defender.  He played four seasons in the Western Soccer Alliance, five in the American Professional Soccer League, at least three in the National Professional Soccer League and one in the Continental Indoor Soccer League.  He also earned two caps with the United States men's national soccer team in 1988.

Professional career

Outdoor soccer
Velazco graduated from La Jolla High School.  In 1984, he joined the San Diego Sockers of the North American Soccer League, but never entered a first-team game.  In 1986, he signed with the San Diego Nomads of the Western Soccer Alliance.  He played with the Nomads through the 1990 season.  During his four seasons with the Nomads, Velazco won the 1987 and 1989 championships.  In 1988, Velazco was a first team All Star.  In 1990, the WSA merged with the American Soccer League to form the American Professional Soccer League.  The Nomads failed to make the playoffs, then withdrew from the league.  Velazco then moved to the Colorado Foxes for the 1991 season.  He moved again in 1992, this time to the Miami Freedom.  On April 29, 1993, he signed with the expansion Los Angeles Salsa  The Salsa lasted only two seasons before folding in 1994.

Indoor soccer
On October 4, 1989, Velazco began his indoor career with the San Diego Sockers of the Major Indoor Soccer League.  In October 1990, he moved to the Milwaukee Wave of the National Professional Soccer League.  He was a first team All Star that season.  He also played at least two seasons, 1992-1994 with the Wichita Wings of the NPSL.  In 1995, he played with the Mexico Toros of the Continental Indoor Soccer League.

National team
Velazco earned two caps with the United States men's national soccer team, both in June 1988.  The first came in a 1–1 tie with Chile on June 1.  The second was a 3–1 loss to Chile two days later.

References

External links
 1989 San Diego Nomads roster
 Career stats

American soccer players
American expatriate soccer players
American Professional Soccer League players
Colorado Foxes players
Continental Indoor Soccer League players
Los Angeles Salsa players
Major Indoor Soccer League (1978–1992) players
Mexico Toros players
Miami Freedom players
Milwaukee Wave players
National Professional Soccer League (1984–2001) players
San Diego Sockers (original MISL) players
Nomads Soccer Club players
Wichita Wings (NPSL) players
United States men's international soccer players
Western Soccer Alliance players
Living people
1964 births
Association football defenders